Universidad is a rapid transit station in San Juan agglomeration, Puerto Rico. It is located between Río Piedras and Piñero stations on the only line of the Tren Urbano system, in the Río Piedras area of the city of San Juan. The station is named after the University of Puerto Rico campus which it serves. The trial service ran in 2004, however, the regular service only started on 6 June 2005.

Nearby 
 University of Puerto Rico, Río Piedras campus
 Universidad Avenue

Gallery

References

Tren Urbano stations
Railway stations in the United States opened in 2004
2004 establishments in Puerto Rico
Railway stations at university and college campuses